Four Schools make up the College of Fine Arts & Communication at East Carolina University.  The College was created on July 1, 2003, but has its roots to the beginning of ECU in 1907.  The School of Theatre and Dance runs productions by the East Carolina Playhouse (student theatre) and the East Carolina Summer Theatre (professional company).

The School of Art and Design 

The School of Art and Design (SoAD) currently has over 500 undergraduates, 25 graduates and 44 faculty members. The SoAD is accredited by the National Association of Schools of Art and Design (NASAD) since 1962, and only 352 other art schools in the country have this honor.

This school offers two bachelor's degrees to its undergrads:
Bachelor of Fine Arts in Art 
Bachelor of Fine Arts in Art Education

School of Communication 

The School of Communication offers a BA, BS, MA and a minor programs, with many concentrations.  

There are four undergraduate concentrations in the School of Communication:
BS Journalism, which prepares students to write and report news through the media of television and radio
BS Interpersonal/Organizational Communication
BS Media Studies, which introduces students to any two of the fields of journalism, media performance, media production and public relations
BS Public Relations

School of Music 

The School of Music is one of the premier music schools in the Southeast.  The Masters in Music in Music Education was recently applauded by National Association of Schools of Music.  The  242 undergraduate and 69 graduate students spend most their time in the A. J. Fletcher Music Center. 

A. J. Fletcher Music Center is the large building that the School of Music calls home.  It has two large rehearsal halls and a 260-seat recital hall. In the center, there are electronic piano labs, five organs, more than fifty practice rooms, faculty studios, the Music Library, and the Center for Music Technology. The Music Library's collection contains more than 62,000 books, scores, periodicals, and media materials representative of all types and periods of music.

In spring of 2007, the A.J. Fletcher Music Center was expanded by the addition of a first-floor wing.  New to this wing is a classroom that is observable, new percussion practice rooms, a new large rehearsal hall and small ensemble rehearsal hall.  The latter two examples have microphones connected to a recording room in between both rehearsal rooms.  With the addition of the new wing, the rehearsal halls count have been raised to two large rehearsal halls and a smaller rehearsal hall.

School of Theatre and Dance 

The School of Theatre and Dance offers the Bachelor of Fine Arts and the Bachelor of Arts. It is the leading theatre school in the southeast. It is set up as a conservatory in a university setting. The faculty includes John Shearin, the director of the School of Theatre and Dance, who is known for his time in soap operas and the Broadway stage. Patch Clark is another notable faculty member, known for her work as the Off Broadway director of Katmandu. Tracy Donohue is also one of the leading speech and acting teachers who has trained worldwide with some of the most experienced people in the field. Alumni include Sandra Bullock and Emily Proctor. Current notable students include Andrew Britt, Rebecca Nugent, McKenna Cox, and whom all have shown great potential. 

East Carolina University divisions